Tetra-n-butylammonium triiodide (TBAI3) is a quaternary ammonium salt with a triiodide counterion. It is a common carrier of the triiodide used in chemical synthesis of photovoltaic materials, organic conductors and superconductors. In crystals, the triiodide moieties are linear and shows high crystallinity. The crystals have a black appearance with a needle or plate-like habit.

See also 
 Triiodide
 Tetrabutylammonium tribromide
 Organic superconductor

References 

Polyhalides
Tetrabutylammonium salts